Charles Livingstone Mbabazi (born 18 October 1980) is a Ugandan football coach and former player who played for St Patrick's Athletic in the League of Ireland Premier Division and the Uganda national team. He was a versatile player with the ability to play on either wing or as a forward. During his time at the club he used the name Mbabazi on the back of his jersey.

Life and career
Mbabazi was introduced to St Patrick's by his then agent John Fashanu. He had previously been playing for Al Ahly SC in the Egyptian Premier League. After protracted negotiations for his international release with the Federation of Uganda Football Associations, he made his Saints debut on St Stephen's Day 1999 against Athlone Town in the Leinster Senior Cup. Mbabazi became a huge fans' favourite, scoring his first goal against Longford Town in a League match at Richmond Park. Memorably, he scored a goal at home to Bray Wanderers, just four days after the death of his father and brother in Uganda.

In June 2002, Mbabzai scored against HNK Rijeka in the 2002 UEFA Intertoto Cup. This game went down in history for Saints as their first ever win in European club competition. After going through on away goals, Charles again netted in the next round in the home tie against K.A.A. Gent.

In 2003, he was forced to retire due to a heart problem after collapsing on the pitch in a league game versus Bohemians. His testimonial against a Brian Kerr select took place in November 2004 before his return to Uganda. Mbabazi won 36 caps for Uganda.

Honours
St Patrick's Athletic
 League of Ireland Cup: 2003

References

External links
 Triumph and tragedy – The remarkable career of Charles Livingstone Mbabazi 

1980 births
Living people
Ugandan footballers
Association football midfielders
Uganda international footballers
League of Ireland players
V.League 1 players
Kampala Capital City Authority FC players
St Patrick's Athletic F.C. players
Becamex Binh Duong FC players
Ugandan expatriate footballers
Ugandan expatriate football managers
Ugandan expatriate sportspeople in Ireland
Expatriate association footballers in the Republic of Ireland
Ugandan expatriate sportspeople in Vietnam
Expatriate footballers in Vietnam
Ugandan expatriate sportspeople in Somalia
Expatriate football managers in Somalia